Samsonenko is a surname. Notable people with the surname include:

 Oleh Samsonenko (born 1965), Ukrainian footballer
 Sergey Samsonenko (born 1967), Russian businessman
 Valentyna Semenyuk-Samsonenko (1957–2014), Ukrainian politician

See also
 

Ukrainian-language surnames